AV input is a common label on a connector to receive (AV) audio/visual signals from electronic equipment that generates AV signals (AV output).

These terminals are commonly found on such equipment as a television, DVD recorder or VHS recorder, and typically take input from a DVD player, a TV tuner, VHS recorder or camcorder.

Types of plugs used for video input
Composite video
RCA connector
BNC connector
UHF connector
1/8 inch minijack phone connector
S-video
DIN plug (also used for Apple Desktop Bus)
Component video
RCA connector
RGBHV
Digital video
HDMI (High Definition Multimedia Interface)
DVI (Digital Video Interface)
IEEE 1394 (FireWire)
SPDIF (Sony Philips Digital Interface)

Audiovisual connectors